Joe McNally (born July 27, 1952) is an American photographer who has contributed to National Geographic. He is based out of New York City and resides in Ridgefield, Connecticut. He has won four awards from World Press Photo.

Early life and education
McNally was born in Montclair, New Jersey. He received his bachelor's and graduate degrees from the S. I. Newhouse School of Public Communications at Syracuse University.

Career
From 1994 until 1998 McNally was Life magazines staff photographer, the first one in 23 years. His most well known series is Faces of Ground Zero — Portraits of the Heroes of September 11th, a collection of 246 giant Polaroid portraits shot in the Moby C Studio near Ground Zero in a three-week period shortly after 9/11. A large group of these life-size (9' x 4') photos were exhibited in seven cities in 2002.

McNally has contributed for National Geographic magazine for many years. One of his photographic projects for the magazine was "The Future of Flying," a 32-page cover story, published in December 2003, commemorating the centennial observance of the Wright brothers' flight. This story was the first all digital shoot for the magazine. This issue was a National Magazine Award Finalist.

He has shot cover stories for Sports Illustrated, Time, Newsweek, Geo, Fortune, New York, Business Week, Life and Men's Journal.

He is known for flash photography.

Publications
Faces of Ground Zero. Portraits of the Heroes of September 11, 2001. New York City: Little, Brown and Company, 2002. .
The Moment It Clicks: Photography secrets from one of the world's top shooters. San Francisco: New Riders, 2008. .
The Hot Shoe Diaries: Big Light from Small Flashes: Creative Applications of Small Flashes. San Francisco: New Riders, 2009. .
Sketching Light: An Illustrated Tour of the Possibilities of Flash. San Francisco: New Riders, 2011. .

Awards
1996: Third prize singles, People in the News, World Press Photo, Amsterdam
1997: First prize singles, Portraits, World Press Photo, Amsterdam
1998: Third prize stories, Arts and Entertainment, World Press Photo, Amsterdam
1998: Alfred Eisenstaedt Award for magazine photography
2000: Second prize stories, Science & Technology, World Press Photo, Amsterdam
2010: Third place, Science/Natural History Picture Story, Pictures of the Year International

References

External links

1952 births
Living people
People from Montclair, New Jersey
People from Westport, Connecticut
S.I. Newhouse School of Public Communications alumni
American photojournalists